Jack Le Brocq (born 7 July 1992) is an Australian professional racing driver. He currently competes in the Repco Supercars Championship, and drives the No. 34 Holden Commodore ZB for Matt Stone Racing. So far, Le Brocq's career highlights include winning the Australian Formula Ford Championship and recording multiple race wins and top 3 championship places in the Dunlop Super2 Series.

Racing career
Le Brocq won the 2012 Australian Formula Ford Championship, which led to a contract with Erebus Motorsport's driver academy. He would race for the team in the 2013 Australian GT Championship, winning 2 rounds and finishing 9th in the championship.

Super2 Series
Le Brocq made his debut in the Dunlop Series with Image Racing in a Ford FG Falcon in 2014. He joined MW Motorsport in 2015 and finished 3rd in the championship. In 2016 Le Brocq joined Prodrive Racing Australia in the No. 5 Ford FG X Falcon. After recording 7 race wins, he finished the championship in 2nd place, behind teammate Garry Jacobson. He then moved back to MW Motorsport in 2017 to drive the No. 28 Nissan Altima L33. Le Brocq would win 3 races and finish 3rd in the championship.

Supercars Championship
Le Brocq made his debut in the Supercars Championship at the 2015 Sandown 500 alongside Ash Walsh in the No. 4 Erebus Motorsport Mercedes-Benz E63 AMG. They finished the race in 19th. The pair then had a DNF at the Bathurst 1000 after the car hit the wall at the cutting. They would again finish in 19th place for the first race at the Gold Coast 600. They were disqualified from the second race.

In 2016, Le Brocq would co-drive with Cameron Waters in No. 6 Ford FG X Falcon for Prodrive Racing Australia. They retired from the 2016 Sandown 500 because of engine issues. At the Bathurst 1000 the pair stayed out of trouble to finish the race in 4th place. At the Gold Coast 600 the retired from the first race after an accident and finished the second race in 14th place.

Le Brocq made his solo Supercars debut at the 2017 Darwin Triple Crown as a wildcard entry, racing with his Super2 team MW Motorsport in the No. 28 Nissan Altima L33. He finished the first race in 19th place before finishing in 22nd for the second race. He also raced at the Ipswich SuperSprint, finishing race 1 in 19th and retiring from race 2. For the Pirtek Enduro Cup he moved to Nissan Motorsport to drive alongside Todd Kelly in the No. 7 Nissan Altima L33. The best finish they recorded was a 7th place at the Bathurst 1000.

In 2018, Le Brocq will make his debut as a full-time driver in the Supercars Championship with Tekno Autosports in the No. 19 Holden ZB Commodore.

Career results

Supercars Championship results

Complete Bathurst 1000 results

References

External links 
 
 
 
 Racing Reference profile

1992 births
Formula Ford drivers
Living people
Supercars Championship drivers
Australian racing drivers
Nismo drivers
Kelly Racing drivers
Matt Stone Racing drivers